Zorenci is a settlement on the left bank of the Lahinja River south of Črnomelj in the White Carniola area of southeastern Slovenia. The area is part of the traditional region of Lower Carniola and is now included in the Southeast Slovenia Statistical Region.

Name

Zorenci was attested in 1463 as Saremcz (and Sorenze in 1744, Sorenzze in 1780, and Sorrenze in 1824). The name Zorenci was created as a folk name from the original local name *Zorenja vas, which is derived from the name Zoren based on the personal name *Zor, Zorislav. Its formation is similar to that of the name Radenci.

History
An archaeological site in the settlement has revealed the presence of an extensive Eneolithic and Bronze Age settlement in the area.

References

External links

Zorenci on Geopedia 

Populated places in the Municipality of Črnomelj